Homer Aubrey Tomlinson (October 25, 1892 – December 5, 1968), was an American bishop in the Church of God of Prophecy, a Pentecostal Holiness Christian denomination founded by his father, Ambrose Jessup Tomlinson in 1922.

Biography
Tomlinson was born on October 25, 1892, in Westfield, Indiana, to Ambrose Jessup Tomlinson. His younger brother, Milton Ambrose Tomlinson, was decided by its presbytery to be God's chosen successor for General Overseer in 1944. The two brothers did not get along, so Homer founded his own splinter "Church of God" denomination around the same time and became its bishop.

He founded the Theocratic Party and was its candidate for U.S. President for elections from 1952 to 1968. 

In 1962, at the University of British Columbia, he declared himself "King of UBC" and "King of the World".  On October 7, 1966, Bishop Tomlinson planned to crown himself King of the World or "King of All Nations of Men" in Jerusalem.

His Church of God group was headquartered in Queens Village, New York, until his death in 1968. He died on December 5, 1968, at the Manhattan Veterans Hospital.

Legacy
His church moved to Huntsville, Alabama after his death.

References

 Whitworth, William (1966-09-24). "On the Tide of the Times: PROFILE of Bishop Homer A. Tomlinson", The New Yorker: 67
 Utt, Richard H. (September/October 2020). "The Preacher Who Wanted to Be President", Liberty

1892 births
1968 deaths
Church of God of Prophecy
American bishops
Churches of God Christians
People from Westfield, Indiana
Theocrats
Self-proclaimed monarchy
Candidates in the 1952 United States presidential election
American monarchists